À l'ombre des derricks is a Lucky Luke comic written by Goscinny and illustrated by Morris. It is the eighteenth title in the series and it was originally published by Dupuis in 1962, in French. English editions of this French series were published by Cinebook Ltd in 2007 as In the Shadow of the Derricks. The story is based on the historical oil rush in Titusville, Pennsylvania in 1859.

Synopsis 
In 1859, Colonel Edwin Drake discovers oil in Titusville, Pennsylvania. There is an unprecedented rush to the small town. Everyone wants to have their share of oil and become rich. The Mayor, who fears overflows, telegraphs Lucky Luke for help. If he accepts, he will be appointed sheriff. At first, he thinks to refuse but he soon realizes that this rush to oil will lead to chaos if it is not controlled and he finally accepts, to the chagrin of Jolly Jumper .

Lucky Luke finds Titusville in chaos. Even the mayor has gone to drill. From the first day, Luke is threatened by a man named Bingle who does not want a law in Titusville. In fact, Bingle is the henchman of a certain Barry Blunt. Bingle is no match for Luke who arrests him. Blunt is quick to arrive and his avowed goal is to seize the city and all the nearby oil fields. He starts by paying Bingle's bail (who does not want to get out of jail because he found oil in his cell). Bingle is thrown out the gang.

In the weeks that followed, Barry Blunt and his men manage, by terror and threat, to seize all the oil wells, except that of Colonel Drake who holds out. Lucky Luke, who needs help, is allied with Colonel Drake. He organizes a plan with Bingle (who always wants to go back to his cell), which provokes Blunt who ends up beating him. Immediately, Luke puts him in prison. The judge refuses to judge him and resigns. Colonel Drake is elected judge and sentences Blunt to twenty years in prison. His men then take advantage of the night to burn the oil wells and help him escape. By court decision, the oil wells returned to their legitimate owners who manage to extinguish the fire. Blunt hides in Titusville where, disguised as an old man, he gets employed by Drake. He wants to kill Lucky Luke, but a gush of oil manages to neutralize him.

Characters 

 Colonel Edwin Drake: Discovers the first oil well in Titusville.
 Billy Smith: Deputy of the previous. Previously drilled salt water wells.
 Bingle: Former assistant to Barry Blunt. He wants to go back to prison because he found oil in his cell while he was there.
 Barry Blunt: Former lawyer from Texas. He wants to appropriate all Titusville's oil legally. He finds a tough opponent in Lucky Luke. For this character, Morris caricatured his friend and colleague Victor Hubinon.
 Jigs: Lucky Luke's deputy. Hates the oil.
 Robert E. Glouton: Judge of Titusville. He resigns when he has to try Barry Blunt.

References

 Morris publications in Spirou BDoubliées

External links
Lucky Luke official site album index 
Goscinny website on Lucky Luke

1962 graphic novels
Fiction set in 1859
Comics set in the 19th century
Comics set in Pennsylvania
Comics by Morris (cartoonist)
Lucky Luke albums
Works originally published in Spirou (magazine)
Works by René Goscinny